The 1900 Quebec general election was held on December 7, 1900, to elect members of the Legislative Assembly of the Province of Quebec, Canada.  The incumbent Quebec Liberal Party, led by Simon-Napoléon Parent, was re-elected, defeating the Quebec Conservative Party, led by Edmund James Flynn.

Results

See also
 List of Quebec premiers
 Politics of Quebec
 Timeline of Quebec history
 List of Quebec political parties
 10th Legislative Assembly of Quebec

Quebec general election
Elections in Quebec
General election
Quebec general election